State Route 151 (SR 151) is a state highway in the U.S. state of California. The route runs along Shasta Dam Boulevard in Shasta County from Shasta Dam to Interstate 5 near Shasta Lake City.

Route description

SR 151 begins at Shasta Dam, where the Sacramento River is dammed to form Shasta Lake. State maintenance specifically begins at the visitor center located south of the dam (the segment of Shasta Dam Boulevard that runs directly to and across the top of the dam is closed to the general public). From there, the road heads south as Shasta Dam Boulevard, crossing through heavily vegetated area. The road then meets CR A18 within the city of Shasta Lake. Heading eastward, the road enters the center of Shasta Lake before meeting its eastern terminus at Interstate 5.

SR 151 is not part of the National Highway System, a network of highways that are considered essential to the country's economy, defense, and mobility by the Federal Highway Administration. SR 151 is eligible for the State Scenic Highway System, and from Shasta Dam to Lake Boulevard is officially designated as a scenic highway by the California Department of Transportation, meaning that it is a substantial section of highway passing through a "memorable landscape" with no "visual intrusions", where the potential designation has gained popular favor with the community.

Major intersections

See also

References

External links

Caltrans: Route 151 highway conditions
California Highways: Route 151
California @ AARoads.com - State Route 151

151
State Route 151
151